Cari Beauchamp (born 1951, Berkeley, California) is an American author, historian, journalist, and documentary filmmaker. She authored the biography Without Lying Down: Frances Marion and the Power of Women in Hollywood, which was subsequently made into a documentary film. She is currently the resident scholar of the  Mary Pickford Foundation.

Career 

Before becoming a full-time writer in 1990, Beauchamp worked as a private investigator, a campaign manager, and served as Press Secretary to California Governor Jerry Brown.

Politics and law 
After graduating with a BA in political science and American history from San Jose State University in 1972, she intended to go to law school, but instead spent the next 6 years as a private investigator for defense attorneys, including Barney Drefus and Charles Garry, and the Legal Aid Society of Santa Clara County, serving as lead investigator on several major class action suits. Simultaneously, she became involved in the Women's Rights Movement and was elected the first  President of National Women's Political Caucus of California in 1973. She also managed a variety of election campaigns throughout the 1970s including for Janet Gray Hayes, who was elected mayor of San Jose in 1976, the first woman in the country to be mayor of a city of over 500,000. Beauchamp also spent several years working in Washington DC with Gloria Steinem, Bella Abzug and many others on behalf of the Equal Rights Amendment before returning to California in 1979 to serve as press secretary to Governor Jerry Brown.

Author 
After a year of working in Europe and several years in New York, she took time off to give birth to two sons. While pregnant with her second son, she signed her first book contract, which resulted in Hollywood on the Riviera: The Inside Story of the Cannes Film Festival with Henri Behar, published by William Morrow & Co.

In 1998, she wrote Without Lying Down: Frances Marion and The Powerful Women of Early Hollywood, published by Scribner and the University of California Press. The book examines the lives of Frances Marion (Oscar-winning screenwriter of The Big House and The Champ) and many of her female colleagues who shaped filmmaking from the 1920s through the 1940s. Without Lying Down was named one of the 100 Most Notable Books of the Year by both The New York Times and the Los Angeles Times and was awarded Book of the Year by the National Theater Arts Association.

In 2003 came  Anita Loos Rediscovered, which was edited and annotated by Beauchamp and  Mary Anita Loos  (Anita Loos' niece). Published by University of California Press, the book compiles samples of Loos's previously unpublished work as well as  the personal life and work of novelist, screenwriter, and playwright,  author of Gentlemen Prefer Blondes, as well as several other books and dozens of plays and screenplays.
In 2006, University of California Press released Adventures of a Hollywood Secretary: Her Private Letters from Inside the Studios of the 1920s by Valeria Belletti, edited and annotated by Beauchamp, with a foreword by Samuel Goldwyn Jr., chronicling an insider's view of the film studios of the 1920s from a secretary's perspective.
In 2009, Beauchamp wrote Joseph P. Kennedy Presents: His Hollywood Years published by Knopf and Vintage Books. The book examines Joseph P. Kennedy's reign in Hollywood, where he held sway over the industry from 1926 to 1930 as the only person to head three studios simultaneously.

Documentary 
Beauchamp wrote and coproduced the documentary film Without Lying Down: Frances Marion and The Powerful Women of Early Hollywood  which premiered in 2000 on Turner Classic Movies, and for which she was nominated for a Writers’ Guild Award. She also wrote the documentary film The Day My God Died about young girls of Nepal sold into sexual slavery which played on PBS and was nominated for an Emmy in 2003.
She has also appeared as expert on film history in a half dozen other documentaries including   Mark Cousin's production of The Story of Film: An Odyssey.

Journalist and film historian 

Beauchamp has written for various magazines and newspapers, including Vanity Fair, Variety, The Hollywood Reporter, The New York Times, and the Los Angeles Times.

She is frequent featured speaker on the subject of Women and Hollywood History, appearing  throughout the United States and Europe including the Academy of Motion Picture Arts and Sciences, the British Film Institute, the Museum of Modern Art, the Edinburgh Film Festival, the Cannes Film Festival, The Los Angeles Times Festival of Books, The Women's Museum of Art in Washington D.C. and the Los Angeles County Museum of Art.

She has been named the Academy of Motion Picture Arts and Sciences Film Scholar twice and is currently  resident scholar of the  Mary Pickford Foundation.

References

External links 

 
 Cari Beauchamp Official Site

1951 births
Living people
American biographers
American women biographers
Writers from Berkeley, California
Journalists from California
San Jose State University alumni
American documentary film producers
American women historians
21st-century American historians
21st-century American women writers